Kieferbach (also: Thierseer Ache) is a river of Tyrol, Austria and Bavaria, Germany. It flows into the Inn near Kiefersfelden.

Course 
The river rises in Tyrol as Klausbach from several small, occasionally dry creeks on the north side of the Schönfeldjoch Mountains near the Ursprung Pass. It flows through the Thierseer Lake in the Thierseetal through the municipality of Thiersee, past the cement quarry in Wachtl over the border to Bavaria. In the Gießenbach, the body of water has the two official names: Kieferbach and Klausenbach. After the tributary of the Gießenbach on the left, the Wachtl-Express-Bahn and the Thierseestraße follow the course of the river through the Klausenbachtal in the direction of Kiefersfelden. About halfway the Hechtsee drain flows to the right. The river then flows as a Kieferbach through the village and finally flows into the Inn in the Unteriefer district.

Usage 

In the middle of Kiefersfelden, there is a weir and a hydropower screw on the right bank.

Ecology 
The course of the Kieferbach is mostly natural, or close to nature. It has water quality class II in Tyrol

See also
List of rivers of Bavaria

References

Rivers of Tyrol (state)
Rivers of Bavaria
Rosenheim (district)
Rivers of Austria
Rivers of Germany
International rivers of Europe